Karu Hakuru is a Maldivian television sitcom, created by Mohamed Munthasir, which streams on Baiskoafu from 12 March 2019. With a cast starring Raufath Sadiq, Lamha Latheef, Hussain Nazim, Ali Azim and Aisha Ali, the show explores the day to day challenges of the lives of a young family. The series was produced by Basikoafu Studio, in association with Okeyz Inc.

Cast

Main
 Raufath Sadiq as Naaif Rasheed
 Lamha Latheef as Liusha
 Hussain Nazim as Ahmed Rasheed
 Ali Azim as Zack
 Aisha Ali as Leeza

Recurring
 Mohamed Afrah as Rah Kudey
 Mohamed Hisam Afeef as Mia

Guest
 Raufa Rasheed Hussain (Episode: "Match")
 Aishath Shahudhaa Rasheed (Episode: "Kurafi")
 Mohamed Jumayyil (Episode: "Nubai Buri" and "Ten Ants")
 Mariyam Ashfa (Episode: "Nightingale")
 Ali Seezan (Episode: "Ten Ants")
 Ahmed Sunie (Episode: "Gudi")
 Maria Teresa Pagano (Episode: "Dhon Bitu")
 Meynaa Hassan (Episode: "Keyolhu")
 Moosa Waseem (Episode: "Baby")
 Ahmed Nimal as Liusha's father (Episode: "Baby")

Episodes

Season 1

Season 2

Season 3

Production
On 15 February 2019, Baiskoafu announced the first Maldivian sitcome, titled Karu Hakuru. An interactive campaign was initiated by Okeyz Inc and Baiskoafu with several taglines for generating a marketing exposure to the series. In March 2019, the star cast including Raufath Sadiq, Lamha Latheef, Hussain Nazim, Ali Azim and Aisha Ali was revealed.

Soundtrack

Release and response
The series was premiered on 12 March 2019 by Musthafa Hussain, in an event which aired the first episode of the series. A new episode of the series was released for streaming at 2100 of every Tuesday. The pilot episode "Keyo" was viewed by more than 3,000 users at the time of release.

The series opened to mostly positive reviews from critics where specific praise was attributed to Lamha Latheef's performance. Aishath Maaha from Dho called Latheef to be "outstanding" from the cast with her "natural and authetic" performance. Maaha opined that Raufath Sadiq as a newcomer "shines" in the comedy role along with Ali Azim, though Hussain Nazim and Aishath need to improve their dialogue delivery".

References

Serial drama television series
Maldivian television shows
Maldivian web series